The Jammu and Kashmir Rifles is an infantry regiment of the Indian Army. Its origins lay in the  Jammu and Kashmir State Forces of the princely state of Jammu and Kashmir. After the accession of the state to the Indian Union in October 1947, the State Forces came under the command of the Indian Army. They remained in the original form until 1956 when Jammu and Kashmir Constituent Assembly effectively ratified the state's accession to India. Then the State Forces became the Jammu and Kashmir Regiment of the Indian Army. In 1963, the designation was changed to Jammu and Kashmir Rifles. After the conversion, the Ladakh Scouts came under the aegis of the Regiment, where it remained until raised as a separate Regiment in 2002.

History
The Jammu and Kashmir Rifles has a unique regimental history. Its antecedents go back to the Dogra Corps raised by Raja Gulab Singh of Jammu in 1821. General Zorawar Singh led daredevil campaigns in northern areas like Ladakh, Baltistan, Gilgit, Hunza and Yagistan, consolidating smaller principalities and making the northern areas a part of the expanding dominions of Gulab Singh. He also mounted an invasion of Tibet in 1841.

After the establishment of Jammu and Kashmir as independent princely state under the British Paramountcy in 1846, these troops became the Jammu and Kashmir State Forces.

The Maharaja of Jammu and Kashmir maintained a larger number of State Forces than any other ruler of an Indian State under the British Raj. These forces were organized into the Jammu and Kashmir Brigades. They comprised a bodyguard cavalry regiment, two mountain batteries, seven infantry battalions, one training battalions and a transport unit consisting of both pack and mechanized transport. Several of these units served with distinction on the North-West Frontier of India and overseas during the Great War. The state forces fought as Imperial Service Troops in both the First and Second World Wars (under their own native officers). They distinguished themselves in East Africa, Palestine and Burma.

Kashmir War of 1947

During the Indo-Pakistani War of 1947 fought primarily in the region, over 76 officers, 31 JCOs, and 1085 Other Ranks were killed in battle. 2 Param Vir Chakra, 3 Maha Vir Chakra, 20 Vir Chakras were earned, and 52 members of the regiment Mentioned in Despatches. Later the Jammu and Kashmir State Force was absorbed en bloc into the Indian Army as a separate regiment.

Sino-Indian War of 1962

Two battalions of Jammu and Kashmir Rifles constituted the main fighting force of India in Aksai Chin during the Sino-Indian War of 1962. Supplemented by a battalion of the regular Indian Army, they fought "very well" according to scholar Steven Hoffman. China attacked them with a massive force of an entire division.

UN Peacekeeping Operations
A Jammu and Kashmir Rifles battalion was part of the UN force in Cambodia during 1990–93.

Recruitment
Much of the Army's Jammu and Kashmir Light Infantry and Jammu and Kashmir Rifles Regiments are made of recruits from the districts of Jammu, Samba, Kathua, Udhampur, and Reasi, while other districts like Poonch, Rajouri, Doda and Kishtwar also contribute . Soldiers from Himachal Pradesh, Punjab, Uttarakhand, Uttar Pradesh, Bihar and Haryana also contribute to the ranks.

Units

In 1947, the force had 9 infantry battalions and a cavalry regiment. It was subsequently raised to 21 battalions. The 16th Battalion has been reassigned as 14th Battalion of the Mechanised Infantry Regiment

Battle honours
 Defence of Chitral
 The Great War: Megiddo, Sharon, Nablus, Palestine 1918, Kilimanjaro, Beho Beho, East Africa 1914–17
 The Second World War: Kennedy Peak, Defence of Meiktila, Burma 1942–45
 1947-48: Ponch, Skardu, 
 1965: Asal Uttar, Punjab 1965
 1971: Shyam Ganj, East Pakistan 1971
 1999: Point 5140, Point 4875, Rocky Knob

Note: Pre-1948 honours inherited from several battalions of Jammu & Kashmir State Forces.

Decorations

Param Vir Chakra
 Captain Vikram Batra (posthumous) 13th Battalion – Kargil, 1999
 Rifleman Sanjay Kumar, 13th Battalion – Kargil, 1999

Maha Vir Chakra
 Brigadier Rajendra Singh Jamwal,  J&K Rifles – Kashmir, 1947
 Brigadier Sher Jung Thapa,  13th J&K Rifles – Skardu, 1947

Other Awards
2 × Param Vir Chakra
2 × Ashok Chakra
1 × Padma Bhushan
3 × Param Vishisht Seva Medals
5 × Maha Vir Chakras
11 × Kirti Chakras
4 × Ati Vishist Seva Medals
44 × Vir Chakras
46 × Shaurya Chakras
1 × Uttam Yudh Seva Medal
313 × Sena Medals
2 × Yudh Seva Medals
31 × Vishisht Seva Medals
52 × Mentioned in Despatches
243 × COAS Commendation Cards
101 × Army Commanders Commendation Cards
 COAS Unit Citation to 4 Jak Rif

See also
 Azad Kashmir Regiment
 Jammu and Kashmir Light Infantry

References

Notes

Further reading
 
 Manju Khajuria, Why we must not forget J&K state forces who fought World War I, Daily O, 7 November 2015.

Infantry regiments of the Indian Army from 1947
Rifle regiments
Military units and formations established in the 1940s
R
Jammu and Kashmir State Forces